Dowlatabad may refer to:

Afghanistan
Dowlatabad, Balkh

Iran

Alborz Province
Dowlatabad, Alborz

Ardabil Province
Dowlatabad, Kowsar, a village in Kowsar County
Dowlatabad, Meshgin Shahr, a village in Meshgin Shahr County
Dowlatabad, Namin, a village in Namin County
Dowlatabad Rural District (Namin County)

Bushehr Province
Dowlatabad, Bushehr

East Azerbaijan Province
 Dowlatabad, Heris, a village in Heris County
 Dowlatabad, Marand, a village in Marand County
 Dowlatabad, Sarab, a village in Sarab County
 Dowlatabad Rural District (Marand County)

Fars Province
Dowlatabad, Darab, a village in Darab County
Dowlatabad, Farashband, a village in Farashband County
Dowlatabad, Now Bandegan, a village in Fasa County
Dowlatabad, Sheshdeh and Qarah Bulaq, a village in Fasa County
Dowlatabad-e Dasht-e Seh Chah, a village in Fasa County
Dowlatabad, Firuzabad, a village in Firuzabad County
Dowlatabad, Jahrom, a village in Jahrom County
Dowlatabad, Kavar, a village in Kavar County
Dowlatabad, Lamerd, a village in Lamerd County
Dowlatabad, Larestan, a village in Larestan County
Dowlatabad-e Qadim-e Yek, a village in Larestan County
Dowlatabad, Kenareh, a village in Marvdasht County
Dowlatabad, Ramjerd-e Yek, a village in Marvdasht County
Dowlatabad, Neyriz, a village in Neyriz County
Dowlatabad, Pasargad, a village in Pasargad County
Dowlatabad, Sarvestan, a village in Sarvestan County
Dowlatabad, Kuhenjan, a village in Sarvestan County
Dowlatabad, Mamasani, a village in Mamasani County
Dowlatabad, Sepidan, a village in Sepidan County
Dowlatabad, Beyza, a village in Sepidan County
Dowlatabad, Shiraz, a village in Shiraz County
Dowlatabad, Bid Zard, a village in Shiraz County

Hamadan Province
 Dowlatabad, former name of Malayer, Hamadan Province
 Dowlatabad, Asadabad, a village in Asadabad County
 Dowlatabad, Bahar, a village in Bahar County
 Dowlatabad, Hamadan, a village in Bahar County
 Dowlatabad, Kabudarahang, a village in Kabudarahang County
 Dowlatabad, Nahavand, a village in Nahavand County

Ilam Province
Dowlatabad, Ilam, a village in Eyvan County

Isfahan Province
Dowlatabad, Ardestan, a village in Ardestan County
Dowlatabad, Isfahan, a city in Borkhar County
Dowlatabad, Chadegan, a village in Chadegan County
Dowlatabad-e Gol Sefid, a village in Chadegan County
Dowlatabad, Dehaqan, a village in Dehaqan County
Dowlatabad, Kuhpayeh, a village in Isfahan County
Dowlatabad, Kashan, a village in Kashan County
Dowlatabad, Nain, a village in Nain County
Dowlatabad, Lay Siyah, a village in Nain County
Dowlatabad, Tiran and Karvan, a village in Tiran and Karvan County

Kerman Province
Dowlatabad, Anbarabad, a village in Anbarabad County
Dowlatabad, Arzuiyeh, a village in Arzuiyeh County
Dowlatabad 3, a village in Baft County
Dowlatabad, Negar, a village in Bardsir County
Dowlatabad, Fahraj, a village in Fahraj County
Dowlatabad, Jiroft, a village in Jiroft County
Dowlatabad, Esfandaqeh, a village in Jiroft Country
Dowlatabad, Sarduiyeh, a village in Jiroft County
Dowlatabad, Kerman, a village in Kerman County
Dowlatabad, Shahdad, a village in Kerman County
Dowlatabad, Narmashir, a village in Narmashir County
Dowlatabad-e Ansari, a village in Narmashir County
Dowlatabad, Rafsanjan, a village in Rafsanjan County
Dowlatabad, Ferdows, a village in Rafsanjan County
Dowlatabad, Rigan, a village in Rigan County
Dowlatabad, Shahr-e Babak, a village in Shahr-e Babak County
Dowlatabad, Sirjan, a village in Sirjan County
Dowlatabad, Sharifabad, a village in Sirjan County
Dowlatabad, Zarand, a village in Zarand County
Dowlatabad Rural District (Kerman Province), in Jiroft County

Kermanshah Province
Dowlatabad-e Olya, a village in Kermanshah County
Dowlatabad-e Sofla, a village in Kermanshah County
Dowlatabad, Ravansar, a village in Ravansar County
Dowlatabad Rural District (Kermanshah Province), in Ravansar County
Dowlatabad, Sahneh, a village in Sahneh County

Khuzestan Province
Dowlatabad, Behbahan, a village in Behbahan County
Dowlatabad, Hoveyzeh, a village in Hoveyzeh County
Dowlatabad, Shushtar, a village in Shushtar County

Kohgiluyeh and Boyer-Ahmad Province
 Dowlatabad, Kohgiluyeh and Boyer-Ahmad, a village in Boyer-Ahmad County

Kurdistan Province
Dowlatabad, Bijar, a village in Bijar County
Dowlatabad, Sanandaj, a village in Sanandaj County
Dowlatabad, Saqqez, a village in Saqqez County

Lorestan Province
Dowlatabad, Azna, a village in Azna County
Dowlatabad, Khorramabad, a village in Khorramabad County

Markazi Province
Dowlatabad, Farahan, a village in Farahan County
Dowlatabad, Saveh, a village in Saveh County

Mazandaran Province
Dowlatabad, Mazandaran, a village in Sari County

North Khorasan Province
Dowlatabad, North Khorasan

Qazvin Province
Dowlatabad, Qazvin

Qom Province
Dowlatabad-e Aqa, Qom Province
Dowlatabad (34°42′ N 50°27′ E), Jafarabad, Qom Province
Dowlatabad (34°49′ N 50°35′ E), Jafarabad, Qom Province
Dowlatabad, Salafchegan, Qom Province

Razavi Khorasan Province
Dowlatabad, Razavi Khorasan, a city in Zave County
Dowlatabad, Chenaran, a village in Chenaran County
Dowlatabad, Dargaz, a village in Dargaz County
Dowlatabad, Fariman, a village in Fariman County
Dowlatabad, Firuzeh, a village in Firuzeh County
Dowlatabad, Nishapur, a village in Nishapur County
Dowlatabad, Zeberkhan, a village in Nishapur County
Dowlatabad, Rashtkhvar, a village in Rashtkhvar County
Dowlatabad, Sabzevar, a village in Sabzevar County
Dowlatabad, Sarakhs, a village in Sarakhs County
Dowlatabad, Torbat-e Jam, a village in Torbat-e Jam County

Semnan Province
Dowlatabad, Aradan, a village in Aradan County
Dowlatabad, Damghan, a village in Damghan County
Dowlatabad, Shahrud, a village in Shahrud County

Sistan and Baluchestan Province
Dowlatabad, Hirmand, a village in Hirmand County

South Khorasan Province
Dowlatabad, Jolgeh-e Mazhan, a village in Khusf County
Dowlatabad, Tabas, a village in Tabas County

Tehran Province
Dowlatabad, Tehran
Dowlatabad, Varamin
Dowlatabad-e Qeysariyeh, Tehran Province

West Azerbaijan Province
Dowlatabad, Bukan, a village in Bukan County
Dowlatabad, Miandoab, a village in Miandoab County

Yazd Province
Dowlatabad, Bafq, a village in Bafq County
Dowlatabad-e Amanat, a village in Yazd County

Zanjan Province
Dowlatabad, Zanjan, a village in Abhar County
Dowlatabad Rural District (Abhar County)

See also
Dowlatabad Rural District (disambiguation)
Doulatabad (disambiguation)